The 1960 DDR-Oberliga was the twelfth season of the DDR-Oberliga, the first tier of league football in East Germany. It was the last season not to be played in the traditional autumn-spring format, with the Oberliga having played for six seasons from 1955 to 1960 in the calendar year format instead, modelled on the system used in the Soviet Union. From 1961–62 onwards the league returned to its traditional format.

The league was contested by fourteen teams. National People's Army club ASK Vorwärts Berlin won the championship, the club's second of six national East German championships. On the strength of the 1960 title Vorwärts qualified for the 1961–62 European Cup where the club was knocked out by Rangers F.C. in the first round. Eighth-placed club SC Motor Jena qualified for the 1961–62 European Cup Winners' Cup as the 1960 FDGB-Pokal winner and advanced to the semi-finals before being knocked out by eventual winners Atlético Madrid.

Bernd Bauchspieß of Chemie Zeitz was the league's top scorer with 25 goals.

Table									
The 1960 season saw two newly promoted clubs, SC Aufbau Magdeburg and SC Chemie Halle.

Results

References

Sources

External links
 Das Deutsche Fussball Archiv  Historic German league tables

1960 domestic association football leagues
1960
1960 in East German football
Ober
Ober